Săvulescu is a Romanian surname that may refer to:

Alexandru Săvulescu (architect)
Alexandru Săvulescu (footballer)
Alice Săvulescu, Romanian botanist
Julian Savulescu, Australian philosopher and bioethicist
Traian Săvulescu, Romanian biologist and botanist

Romanian-language surnames